The Hôtel de Valbelle is a listed hôtel particulier in Aix-en-Provence.

Location
It is located at 24, rue Mignet on one side and the rue Lisse-Saint-Louis on the other side, in Aix-en-Provence.

History
It was built for Joseph-Anne de Valbelle de Tourves (1648-1722) in 1655, when he was only seven years old. He later served as President a mortier of the Parliament of Aix-en-Provence. The hotel was restored and expanded by his great-grandson, Joseph-Alphonse-Omer de Valbelle (1729-1818), in the eighteenth century.

It currently houses the under-prefecture. As of June 2013, the sous-prefecture is hoping to sell it for €9 million, while the city council would only be willing to purchase it for €3.5 million; thus its future ownership is uncertain.

Heritage significance
It has been listed as a monument historique since 1983.

References

Hôtels particuliers in Aix-en-Provence
Monuments historiques of Aix-en-Provence
Houses completed in 1655
1655 establishments in France